Ardoise  is a community in the Canadian province of Nova Scotia, located in the Municipal District of West Hants .  Ardoise  had a small gold mining industry from 1887 to 1904, and was named after its slate bedrock [ Ardoise  means "slate" in french ].

References

 Ardoise on Destination Nova Scotia
Ardoise on "Not Your Grandfather's Mining Industry"

Communities in Hants County, Nova Scotia